Denyc Boles is an American politician from the state of Oregon. A Republican, she was a member of the Oregon House of Representatives from 2014 to 2015 and since 2018.

Boles worked as chief of staff for State Representative Kevin Cameron. Cameron resigned on June 2, 2014, to become a member of the Marion County Commission. The members of the Commission then selected Boles to succeed Cameron. She informed the Commission that she would not run for election to the seat in the 2014 elections. She was sworn in on July 1. In October 2017, she announced she was running in the Republican Party primary for Marion County Commissioner.

In January 2018, Boles was again appointed to the House to fill the remainder of Jodi Hack's term.

In May 2018, Boles won a competitive republican primary. In November 2018, Denyc Boles (R) beat Mike Ellison (D) in the general election for the 19th district in the Oregon House of Representatives.

On June 25, 2019, commissioners from Marion and Polk counties appointed Boles to replace former state Senator Jackie Winters as the representative for District 10 in the Oregon State Senate. Winters died of lung cancer on May 29, 2019, leaving the seat vacant. Boles was sworn into office on June 28, 2019. Boles was unopposed in the May 19, 2020, Republican primary to retain the seat. She lost the general election on November 3, 2020 to Democrat Deb Patterson.

Personal life
Boles grew up in Salem, attending Sprague High School before earning a bachelor's degree from Seattle Pacific University. Boles is married with three children.

References

Living people
Republican Party members of the Oregon House of Representatives
Politicians from Salem, Oregon
Women state legislators in Oregon
Place of birth missing (living people)
Year of birth missing (living people)
Seattle Pacific University alumni
21st-century American women